Channel 1 was a Syrian television channel launched on 23 July 1960. It aired service programs. The channel can only be seen in Syria. It was a local channel that is interactive. For example, people can call in with a plumbing problem in a particular area and the program will contact the authorities on the viewer's behalf to try to get the issue resolved. Channel 1 was shut down in 2012.

References

External links
Channel 1 (Syria) live stream 

1960 establishments in Syria
Arabic-language television stations
Television channels in Syria
Television channels and stations established in 1960
Television channels and stations disestablished in 2012
State media
Television channel articles with incorrect naming style